Al-Fateh ("the Conqueror") is an Islamic children's magazine in Arabic. It is published biweekly in London, and is also posted online. It began publication in September 2002, and its 108th issue was released in mid-September 2007. The magazine features stories, poems, riddles, and puzzles. The site states it is for "the young builders of the future".

It has a link to the Hamas non-official website PIC, so Israel said that it is owned by Hamas.

Criticism
Several Israeli reviews and news coverages of the site describe it as hate-mongering and accuse it of glorifying death and suicide for Allah.

Glorification of operations
According to MEMRI, the magazine includes incitement to jihad and martyrdom and glorification of terrorist operations and of their planners and perpetrators. as well as characterizations of Jews as "murderers of the prophets" and laudatory descriptions of parents who encourage their sons to kill Jews. In each issue, a regular feature titled "The Story of a Martyr" presents the "heroic deeds" of a mujahid from one of the organisations who died in a suicide operation (including operations against civilians) or who was killed by the IDF.

MEMRI also says that the magazine includes illustrations of figures (including child warriors) who embody the ancient Islamic ethos of jihad and martyrdom, presenting them as role models. These include the magazine's titular character, Al-Fateh ("The Conqueror") – a small boy on a horse brandishing a drawn scimitar – as well as children carrying guns, and photos of Hamas fighters launching Qassam rockets.

The Intelligence and Terrorism Information Center at the Center for Special Studies (C.S.S) and others argued that "Issue number 38 of Al-Fateh, includes a photograph of the severed head of a female suicide bomber."

The Anti-defamation League reported that an issue from 1 March 2006 (after Hamas won control of the Palestinian parliament) highlights Hamas suicide bomber, Nassim Jabari, who participated in an August 2004 attack that killed 16 people in Israel.  The issue also shows a figure (below) of a girl throwing stones from a slingshot, and a poem next to the figure which in part reads: "The blood of the shahid has taught us/that martyrdom is like a new life…/and indeed martyrdom is an evident victory.". An issue from 1 May 2007 includes a "games" section with a virtual "Chutes and Ladders" board game consisting of images of Israeli soldiers with snake bodies and tongues and caricatures of children throwing stones, titled "The Palestinian kid and the Israeli soldier".

According to PMW, suicide terror for children is glorified on Hamas children's website. On 15 March 2006 the website posted a short fictional story for children, glorifying a young girl's suicide terror attack. It describes how she calmly progresses, step by step, planning and executing her death in a suicide terror attack. The girl heroically leads "Zionist soldiers" to their death, all the while knowing she will be killed along with them. In death she is said to be "smiling, lying on the grass, because she died as a Shahida (Martyr for Allah) for Palestine." The story is entitled "A Palestinian Girl's Heroism."

The ADL stated that the website also "advocates hatred of Jews".

MEMRI reported that Issue No. 35 tells of a girl named Asra who accompanies her grandmother on a visit to Palestinian prisoners in an Israeli jail. She asks her grandmother about the peace "that everyone is talking about," and her grandmother replies: "Do not forget, Asra, that we are dealing with the Jews, whom the Koran describes very explicitly. All these descriptions are clearly confirmed by today's [reality]. The Koran gives a very accurate characterization [of the Jews]. For example... they lie. In the past, they murdered the envoys of peace, prophets whom Allah had sent to [bring] justice and peace [to the world] and to deliver people from the darkness into the light. [The Jews] killed them, and also tried to kill the Prophet Muhammad in Medina. Today, they kill the followers of God's messenger."

Response
After PMW publicized that the Hamas children's website was encouraging children to seek martyrdom, the Russian server (CORBINA TELECOM Network Operations) immediately closed down the website on 9 March 2006. However, the site reopened a couple of days later and is now being hosted by a Malaysian web-hoster.

Hamas has denied involvement in the website. Farhat Abu-Assad, a Hamas official in Ramallah, told The Jerusalem Post that many Islamic sites sympathise with Hamas "but that does not make them Hamas Web sites. The [people who run these sites] are private individuals that might sympathise with Hamas, but Hamas does not recognise these Web sites.".
	
However, according to Palestinian Media Watch, a man by the name of Nizar Hussein who sits in Lebanon runs the children's Hamas website, and works together with leading Hamas official in Lebanon, Osama Hamdan.

See also

 Al-Aqsa TV
 Palestinian Information Center

Notes and references

2002 establishments in the United Kingdom
Arabic-language magazines
Biweekly magazines published in the United Kingdom
Children's magazines published in the United Kingdom
Children's websites
Hamas
Magazines established in 2002
Magazines published in London